Eyre is a surname with legendary origin from the Norman conquest of England.

Origin
The legend of the person who was the founder of the Eyre and Ayre families, and who was supposedly previously known by the surname "Truelove" (or "True Love"), is a story that appears in genealogies. However, there is no definitive historical evidence confirming the existence of this person.

After the battle William told him "thou shalt hereafter instead of Truelove be called Eyre because thou hast given me the air I breathe."

Truelove the "Eyr" or "Heyr" was granted land in Derby as a reward for his services, together with a Coat of Arms featuring "a human leg in Armour couped at the thigh quarterly argent and sable spurred", in reference to the sacrifice of his limb. Some of these features may persist in one of the current Eyre coats of arms, which features three gold quatrefoils on a black chevron with a white background.

Another variation of the story of the origin of the Eyre crest is that Humphrey le Heyr of Bromham rescued Richard Coeur de Lion at the siege of Ascalon, at the cost of his leg, and that the leg couped was granted to him in remembrance of the occasion.

List
Notable people with the surname include:
Agnes Gardner Eyre (1881–1950), American pianist and composer
Alan Eyre (1930 – 2020), British-born Jamaican geographer
Alan Eyre (diplomat), Persian-language spokesperson of the United States Department of State
Anthony Eyre (Boroughbridge MP) (1727–88)
Anthony Eyre (Nottinghamshire MP) (1634–71)
Charles Eyre (disambiguation), several people
Chris Eyre, film director and producer
Damian Eyre, Australian police officer murdered in 1988
Damian Eyre (cricketer), British cricketer
Edward John Eyre, Australian explorer and Jamaican Governor
Ella Eyre, British singer-songwriter
George Eyre (d. 1839), Royal Navy officer
Giles Eyre (disambiguation), several people
Henry Eyre (barrister) (1628–1678), British politician and lawyer
Henry Eyre (British Army officer) (1834–1904), British Army officer and politician
Isaac Eyre (1875–1947), English footballer
Ivan Eyre, Canadian artist
James Eyre (disambiguation), several people
Jehu Eyre, figure of the American Revolution
Jim Eyre (caver) (1925–2008), British caver
Jim Eyre (architect), British architect and winner of the Bodley Medal
John Eyre (disambiguation), several people
Kingsmill Eyre (1682–1743), English garden designer and inventor
Les Eyre, former Norwich City F.C. footballer
Manuel Eyre, figure of the American Revolution and powerful business leader in the early American Republic
Mary Eyre (1923–2013), British sportswoman and administrator
M. Banning Eyre, Canadian writer and guitarist
Reginald Eyre (1924–2019), British politician
Richard Eyre (disambiguation), several people
Robert Eyre (disambiguation), several people
Samuel Eyre (1633–1698), English judge
Scott Eyre, Major League Baseball relief pitcher
Tommy Eyre, English rock musician
Wayne Eyre, Canadian general
William Eyre (disambiguation), several people
Willie Eyre, Major League Baseball relief pitcher
Wilson Eyre (1858–1944), American architect

Fiction
 Jane Eyre, the titular protagonist of the novel by Charlotte Brontë.

See also
 Eyre family

References

Further reading
 A Truelove family history 800-1500 
 Origin of the name Ayre
 A 100-year-old transcript which refers to "True Love" instead of "Truelove"
 From The Genealogy of the Ayers Family, New York City, 1902
 A short account of the family of Eyre of Eyrecourt
 Burke's Peerage, 1937
 Origin of the name Ayre in England and Scotland